Christopher Thomas Anthony (born 23 July 1976) is a former international Wales rugby union player. A prop, he played his club rugby for Newport Gwent Dragons.

Anthony played club rugby for several amateur teams including Newport and Swansea. His first international cap was against United States national rugby union team at Wilmington in 1997.

References

External links
Newport Gwent Dragons profile

1976 births
Living people
Barbarian F.C. players
Dragons RFC players
Ebbw Vale RFC players
Newport RFC players
Rugby union players from Neath
Rugby union props
Swansea RFC players
Wales international rugby union players
Welsh rugby union players
Welsh schoolteachers